Sergey Borisovich Shupletsov (April 25, 1970 in Chusovoy – July 14, 1995 in La Clusaz) was a Russian freestyle skier and Olympic medalist. He received a silver medal at the 1994 Winter Olympics in Lillehammer, in moguls.  Jean-Luc Brassard won gold, and Edgar Grospiron got bronze.

In 1995, Shupletsov won the World Cup tour in Moguls.  That year he had six World Cup wins (including winning five in a row) and placed 2nd three times.  He died shortly afterward, on July 14, 1995, in a motorcycle accident.

He competed in 102 World Cups and was on the podium 32 times with 12 victories.

References

1970 births
1995 deaths
People from Chusovoy
Russian male freestyle skiers
Freestyle skiers at the 1992 Winter Olympics
Freestyle skiers at the 1994 Winter Olympics
Olympic freestyle skiers of the Unified Team
Olympic freestyle skiers of Russia
Olympic silver medalists for Russia
Motorcycle road incident deaths
Olympic medalists in freestyle skiing
Medalists at the 1994 Winter Olympics
Road incident deaths in France
Soviet male freestyle skiers
Sportspeople from Perm Krai